"Wild Ones" is a song by American rapper Flo Rida featuring Australian singer-songwriter Sia from his fourth studio album of the same name (2012). It was by written by the artists alongside Jacob Luttrell, Marcus Cooper, Niklaas Vogel-Kern, and producers soFLY & Nius and Axwell, while the engineering and recording of the record was handled by Skylar Mones. Lyrically, the song contracts themes including partying, love and dancing while the musical composition is an uptempo dance-pop song that is influenced by house music and electro house.

It was released as the album's second single and title track on December 19, 2011,  in the United States. The single peaked at number one in Australia, Canada, Honduras, New Zealand, and Norway, whilst it peaked inside the top forty in every country chart it charted on. It charted at number five on the US Billboard Hot 100.

The music video was released, featuring Flo Rida having fun with his friends. Sia, however, was not featured in the final video. This song along with "Good Feeling" was selected to serve as one of the official theme songs to WrestleMania XXVIII and it was also featured in The Rock's Road to Wrestlemania vignettes where he prepares for his match with John Cena at the event. Flo Rida performed the songs "Good Feeling" and "Wild Ones" live at the event to precede Rock's entrance for the match. With over 6.5 million copies sold globally, it is Flo Rida's fourth best selling and one of the top 250 best-selling singles.

Background
The "Titanium" project got Australian singer-songwriter Sia into Guetta's powerful inner circle, including Atlantic Records director of A&R Ben Maddahi, who then introduced Sia to Flo Rida and his team, yielding "Wild Ones". The song, with Sia as the featured artist, serves as the second official single from Rida's album of the same name.

Sia originally wrote the chorus and music to the song in 15 minutes for Katy Perry, who never received the song; additional lyrical contributions were made by Rida, Jacob Luttrell, Marcus Cooper, Benjamin Maddahi and the song's producers soFLY & Nius and Axwell.

Sia later said: "They asked me to record ["Wild Ones"] over and over for almost six months. Eventually I said, 'OK, but don't put my name on it.' I was angry because we had already had this discussion. Jonathan said to me, 'I don't think I really believed you that you didn't want to be credited or get the recognition you deserve.'"

Composition 
"Wild Ones" is an uptempo dance-pop song that includes influences of house music and electro house. According to Bill Lamb from About.com, "There is clearly a well worn formula to Flo Rida's blend of hip hop, dance, and pop. [...] he has not worn out his welcome. It is the moments when "Wild Ones" breaks down into that simple combination of synth keyboards and Sia's voice that the song commands our attention." David Jeffries from Allmusic compared the song to Katy Perry's "Firework", which was released one year previous, saying "The title cut [Wild Ones] with [Sia] is close to Katy Perry's "Fireworks" but crafted to support a sports highlight reel instead of teenage dreams [...]"

"Wild Ones" is written and composed in the key of A ♭ major, it is built of the chord progression A ♭-Cm-Fm-D ♭ and is set in time signature of common time with a tempo of 127 beats per minute. Sia's vocal range spans from E ♭ 4 to C 5

In the lyrics, Sia starts off singing "Hey I heard you were a wild one, ooh / If I took you home it'd be a home run / Show me how you do / I want to shut down the club with you / Hey I heard you like the wild ones, ooh." After her introduction, Flo Rida raps "I like crazy, foolish, stupid / Party going wild, fist pumping music / I might lose it / Blast to the roof, that's how we do'z it / I don't care the night, she don't care we like / Almost there, the right vibe / Ready to get live / Ain't no surprise, take me so high."

Critical reception
Billboard described Sia's voice as a "bell-clear, campfire-warm voice [that] has mostly been applied to her own elegantly quirky creations". DJBooth.com compared the song to "Good Feeling", stating that it is a "slightly more subdued, but equally dancefloor/radio-ready follow-up". Tim Byron from The Vine stated, "When [Sia] sings the chorus, phrases like 'I heard' and 'if I took you home' speak of uncertainty. She likes the idea of wildness, but isn't certain how it will go. Flo Rida's role in the song is to convince her that she actually does want to be a wild one, to convince her that it is okay to let go, to obliterate herself."

The song was nominated to the Grammy Award for Best Rap/Sung Collaboration at the 55th Annual Grammy Awards.

Commercial reception

Chart performance
The song made its debut at number twelve on the New Zealand Singles Chart. In its second week, it entered the top ten on ten, and in its third week it peaked atop of the charts. It became Flo Rida's second number-one single in that country and Sia's first number-one. The song was certified Gold in its first month and eventually received double platinum in May 2012, staying in the charts for twenty-two weeks. In Sia's native Australia, it debuted at twenty-nine. In its third week, it rose to number two and eventually peaked at one for six consecutive weeks, pushing Foster The People's single "Pumped Up Kicks" off the top spot. It became Sia's first number-one, while it was Flo Rida's third number-one. The song received septuple platinum in Australia, selling over 500,000 copies there and had over five songs that received certifications in one year.

In France, the song debuted at seventy-six. Despite a slow start, it eventually peaked at number eleven on the chart, being one position off the top ten. The song debuted at twenty-nine on the Swedish Singles Chart, during the New Year's Day week. The song eventually peaked at number three on the chart and was certified quintuple platinum by the IFPI, selling over 200,000 copies and is the eighty-third best-selling single in that country. In Norway, the song entered at fifteen on their native singles chart and eventually peaked at number one in its fifth week, and in total, spent twenty-one weeks on the chart.

"Wild Ones" made its official debut at number fifty-seven on the US Billboard Hot 100. The single eventually peaked at number five on the chart, and stayed for thirty-six weeks on the chart, making it Flo Rida's third-longest charting single, just behind "Low" and "Good Feeling". The song also achieved success on its component charts, peaking at two on the Mainstream Top 40, eight on the Rap Songs and thirty on the Hot Dance Club Songs. It was certified triple platinum by Recording Industry Association of America (RIAA), with over 3,000,000 sales sold there. In the United Kingdom, the song peaked at number four on their singles chart after debuting at number four. It sold 695,000 copies in the UK in 2012, making it the 10th best-selling single of 2012.

Year-end charts
In New Zealand, the song was the sixth best-selling single of 2012, while his then-next single "Whistle" was the fifth best selling single that same year. In Canada, the song was the eighth best-selling single of 2012, while in the United Kingdom, it was the tenth best selling single. In the United States, the song was the eleventh top-selling single according to Billboard.

As of December 2012, the song has sold 3,444,000 digital copies in the United States and 6.5 million copies worldwide.

As with the sales of Flo Rida's "Wild Ones" and his other singles; "Low" (6,786,026), "Right Round" (5,475,096), "Good Feeling" (3,903,872), "Whistle" (3,791,107) and "Club Can't Handle Me" (3,079,302), the sales all tally over 26 million sales worldwide, making him the best selling rapper in the digital music era.

Music video
The video directed by Erik White was released on February 9, 2012, showing Flo Rida partying in Dubai and Miami. In Dubai, it shows the Infinity Tower, Burj Al Arab, and Palm Jumeirah.  While the song features Sia, she does not appear in the video. Sia's vocals were lipsynced
by Analicia Chaves. The video also features Cuban model Dayami Padron on the boat scenes to the left of Flo Rida.

Live performances and other appearances
Flo Rida performed the song on the finale of second season of The Voice with contestant Juliet Simms singing the chorus. He also performed the song with Carly Rae Jepsen at the 2012 MuchMusic Video Awards, with Stayc Reigns at the 2012 Teen Choice Awards and the 2012 Premios Juventud, with Bebe Rexha at the 2016 Teen Choice Awards, and at WrestleMania XXVIII prior to The Rock's entrance for his "Once in a Lifetime" match against John Cena. He released a Coke Studio Fusion Mix featuring Myriam Fares on May 30, 2013. He performed a mash-up of this song along with two more of his famous songs on July 21, 2014, on WWE RAW MIAMI. It also appeared in the trailer of Kung Fu Panda 3.

Wild One Two

A remix version entitled "Wild One Two" by Jack Back featuring David Guetta, Nicky Romero and Sia was released on February 14, 2012. An edited version of the song appears in the 2012 re-release of Guetta's album Nothing but the Beat 2.0.

Track listing

Charts

Weekly charts

Year-end charts

Decade-end charts

Certifications

Release history

See also
 List of number-one dance singles of 2012 (U.S.)

References

2011 singles
2011 songs
Flo Rida songs
Sia (musician) songs
David Guetta songs
Nicky Romero songs
Number-one singles in Australia
Number-one singles in Honduras
Number-one singles in New Zealand
Number-one singles in Norway
Canadian Hot 100 number-one singles
Music videos directed by Erik White
Songs written by Sia (musician)
Song recordings produced by SoFly and Nius
Songs written by Flo Rida
Songs written by Axwell
Song recordings produced by David Guetta
Songs written by Jacob Luttrell